Todd D. Hawkins (born August 2, 1966) is a Canadian former professional ice hockey player who played ten games in the National Hockey League; eight with the Vancouver Canucks and two with the Toronto Maple Leafs.

Career statistics

External links 

1966 births
Living people
Belleville Bulls players
Canadian ice hockey left wingers
Cincinnati Cyclones players
Cleveland Lumberjacks players
Essen Mosquitoes players
Flint Spirits players
Fredericton Express players
Hannover Scorpions players
Ice hockey people from Ontario
Sportspeople from Kingston, Ontario
Milwaukee Admirals (IHL) players
Minnesota Moose players
Newmarket Saints players
St. John's Maple Leafs players
Toronto Maple Leafs players
Vancouver Canucks draft picks
Vancouver Canucks players